Streptomyces mobaraensis is a spore forming bacterium species from the genus of Streptomyces. Streptomyces mobaraensis produces bleomycin, detoxin, piericidin A, piericidin B, reticulol and transglutaminase. Streptomyces mobaraensis is used in the food industry to produce transglutaminase to texture meat and fish products.

Further reading

See also 
 List of Streptomyces species

References

External links
Type strain of Streptomyces mobaraensis at BacDive -  the Bacterial Diversity Metadatabase	

mobaraensis
Bacteria described in 1991